Mandera County is the northeasternmost county in Kenya. Its capital and largest town is Mandera. The county is bordered by Ethiopia to the north, Somalia to the east and Wajir County to the southwest. The main economic activity in the county is pastoralism, while others include cross-border trade with Ethiopia, artisanal mining, beekeeping, and agriculture along the Dawa River.

Climate 
The county has a temperature range between 24C – 42C. Rainfall is very low and unreliable with annual average of 91.7mm annually. Long rains normally occur in April and May averaging 69.1mm while short rains in October and November averaging 122mm.

Demographics 

The Kenya Population and Housing Survey report (KPHC) 2009 showed that Mandera County had a population of 1,025,756 persons. This comprised 559,943 males (54.6%) and 465,813 females (45.4%). The county's population was projected to be 1,399,503 persons, comprising 763,966 males and 635,537 females in 2017.

The county has a total population of 867,457 of which 434,976 are males, 432,444 females and 37 intersex persons. There are 125,763 household with an average household size of 6.9 persons per household and a population density 33 people per square kilometre 2020.

It was also projected that the population would be 1,699,437 persons comprising 927,695 males and 771,742 females in the year 2022.

Like in other areas of North Eastern counties, Mandera is predominantly inhabited by ethnic Somalis.

Population

Administrative and political units

Administrative units 
There are 7 sub counties, 22 divisions, 97 locations and 141 sub-locations.

Sub-counties 

 Mandera East
 Mandera West
 Banisa
 Mandera North
 Lafey
 Mandera South
 Kutullo
Arabia
Kiliwehiri

Electoral constituencies 
It has 6 constituencies and 30 county assembly wards.

Mandera West Constituency
Banissa Constituency
Mandera East Constituency
Lafey Constituency
Mandera South Constituency
Mandera North Constituency

Political leadership 
[[Mohamed Adan Khalif is the governor in office after being elected twice 2022 and his deputy is DR Ali Moalim Mohamud. Mahamud Mohamed M is the Senator who replaced Billow Kerow who was the first elected senator. Amina Gedow is the second elected women representative who won against Fathia Mahbuub, the first women representative for the county.

For Mandera County, the County Executive Committee comprises:-

Members of Parliament 2017-2022 (Mandera County) 

 Hon Omar Mohamed – omar salla of EFP Party Member o.f Parliament Mandera Constituency.
 Hon. Hassan, Kulow Maalim of EFP party Member of Parliament West Banisa Constituency.
 Hon. Hassan, Omar Mohamed Maalim of EFP Party Member of Parliament Mandera East Constituency.
 Hon. Ibrahim, Abdi Mude of EFP Party Member of Parliament Lafey Constituency.
 Hon. Ali, Adan Haji of Jubilee Party Member of Parliament Mandera South Constituency.
 Hon. Abdullah, Bashir Sheikh of Jubilee Party Member of Parliament Mandera North Constituency.

Members of the County Assembly

 Hon Saad Sheikh Ahmed (Abajano)[²⁶] EFP PARTY Member of County Assembly Fino Ward
 Hon Hussein Adan Haji(HajiHuska)[⁶] EFP PARTY Member of County Assembly Takaba South Ward

Health 
There is a total of 83 health facilities in the county and 150 health personnel of different cadre.

HIV prevalence is at 1.8%, below the national average of 5.3%.

Transport and communication 
The county is covered by 1,884.5 km of road network. Of this 1,390 km is covered by earth surface, 494.5 km is murram surface.

There are 13 cyber cafes, 5 post offices installed letter boxes, 1150 rented letter boxes and 1100 rented letter boxes, and 50 vacant letter boxes.

Trade and commerce 

There are 32 trading centers, 127 licensed retail traders, 212 licensed hawkers and 10 petrol stations.

Mandera Town is the most densely populated urban area of the county, while Takaba is the least populated.

The town is the oldest and main urban section of the county and its high population is attributed to the residents' diverse economic activities. The town has small-scale traders; retailers, artisans, hoteliers, grocers and even cross-border traders.

County subdivisions 

As of 2022, Mandera County is divided into 6 sub-counties:

Mandera East that hosts the county headquarters in Mandera Town is the most densely populated constituency with 106 persons per square kilometer. Mandera North is the least densely populated constituency with 42 persons per square kilometer, but which is projected to be 47 and 51 persons per square kilometers 2020 and 2022 respectively.

Electoral constituencies

References

External links
 http://softkenya.com/county/mandera-county/ Mandela County
Map of the District
http://www.reliefweb.int/rw/RWB.NSF/db900SID/VBOL-6UEDLF?OpenDocument
http://www.aridland.go.ke/districts.asp?DistrictID=9

 
Counties of Kenya
Somali-speaking countries and territories